USCGC Unalga (WPG-53) was a Miami-class cutter that served in the United States Revenue Cutter Service and later the U.S. Coast Guard and U.S. Navy. The early part of her career was spent patrolling the Pacific coast of the United States and the Bering Sea. After 1931 she did patrol work off Florida and in the Caribbean. After Unalga was sold in 1946, she was renamed after Jewish Agency leader Haim Arlosoroff and used for six months for moving Jewish refugees from Europe to Palestine before being forced to run aground by British Navy ships near Haifa.

History

U.S. Revenue Cutter Service

Reporting for her first assignment
USRC Unalga, a cutter built for the Revenue Cutter Service by the Newport News Shipbuilding and Drydock Corporation, was authorized June 1911 and launched on 10 February 1912. After leaving the shipyard in convoy with USRC Apache, she arrived at Baltimore, Maryland, 27 April and was placed in commission by the Revenue Cutter Service at its depot at Arundel Cove, Maryland, on 23 May 1912. After spending the summer outfitting at the USRC Depot, Washington Navy Yard and Newport News Shipbuilding, she received orders to report to the RCS Northern Division at Port Townsend, Washington on 6 September 1912. Departing Norfolk, Virginia, on 26 September, Unalga arrived at Port Said, Egypt, on 1 November after making stops at ports of call at Gibraltar, Naples, Italy and Malta. While preparing to transit the Suez Canal, she received orders to report to US Ambassador William Woodville Rockhill at Constantinople. Rockhill directed that Unalga remain in the area to protect Americans in Turkey during the Italo-Turkish War in Libya. She departed Port Said on 17 December, the same day a peace conference was convened in London to settle differences between the Ottoman Empire and the Balkan League. After stops at Aden, Ceylon, Singapore, Manila, Yokohama, and Honolulu, Unalga reported to the Commander, RCS Northern Division at Port Townsend, Washington on 22 March 1913, which in turn assigned her to the Bering Sea Patrol.

Bering Sea Patrol
The first patrol Unalga sailed lasted from 3 May until 11 August when she returned to Port Townsend. On 21 September Unalga departed Port Townsend for a new assignment with the RCS Southern Division headquartered at San Francisco arriving for patrol duties on 25 September. She served with the Southern Division until detached on 25 March 1914. She was at Oakland for repairs for the first twenty days of April and left for duty in Alaska following completion of the repairs. For the next three years Unalga rotated between assignments in Alaska and Port Townsend and added the duty of enforcing the Neutrality Act when World War I started in Europe on 1 August 1914.

U.S. Coast Guard

Alaska patrols
On 28 January 1915 USRC Unalga became USCGC Unalga by virtue of the establishment of the United States Coast Guard by merger of the United States Revenue Cutter Service with the United States Life-Saving Service. In February 1915 additional duties were assigned enforcing the North Pacific Fur Seal Convention of 1911 which related to prohibited pelagic sealing in the Bering Sea. Patrol work during 1915 and 1916 consisted of summers in Alaskan waters with sealing treaty duties, law enforcement, search and rescue, medical assistance to fishermen and others, and the delivery of mail to remote camps. Winters were spent at various locations along the Pacific Northwest coast doing law enforcement patrol work. In January 1917, Unalga was assigned her first winter patrol in Alaskan waters at the urging of representatives of the fishing industry to provide medical services to crews of fishing vessels as well as search and rescue work in remote waters. She stopped in Sitka, Alaska to investigate reports of a measles epidemic and to take on more coal for her first winter mission into the Gulf of Alaska. Unalga'''s first winter patrol was begun 30 January during a squall with hurricane force winds that iced the cutter over and threaten to sink her with the additional weight. After the starboard whaleboat was smashed by heavy seas and the radio masts snapped from the weight of ice, Captain Frederick Dodge made for the shelter of Yakutat Bay. The cutter was listing starboard at twenty degrees and the crew had to clear ice from the decks and machinery with axes and steam hoses. The crew of Unalga spent the next week repairing damage to the cutter while the surgeon treated the ills of inhabitants of Yakutat and gave the resident missionary a short course in medicine. Each time the cutter would leave the shelter of the bay another gale would appear, but Dodge took care to seek shelter before the cutter was as severely iced as the first time. Unalga was recalled to Seattle on 6 March after steaming 3000 miles, boarding 342 vessels, having given medical aid to 19 individuals, of whom three were fishermen.

U.S. Navy and World War I
On 6 April 1917 the United States declared war on the "Imperial German Government" and the Coast Guard was placed under the jurisdiction of the U.S. Navy for the duration of the war by executive order signed by President Woodrow Wilson.Johnson, p 43 Duties for Unalga did not change under Navy control initially and she left for her usual summer patrol work in Alaskan waters on 4 May. At the end of the summer cruise, she was assigned submarine tender duties with the Twelfth Naval District and home-ported at San Pedro, California, arriving 17 October. On 6 May 1918 she left Seattle for her usual Alaska patrol work, but in late May the captain was notified by radio to report to Unalaska to assist with an influenza epidemic. The crew tended eighty sick persons, distributed food, made coffins and buried the dead. In mid-June Unalga steamed to Bristol Bay and up the Nushagak River to Dillingham, Alaska providing medical services to the ill and burial details for the dead. By the end of June the epidemic had abated and Unalga resumed patrol work in the Gulf of Alaska. She  returned to San Pedro and submarine tender duties on 17 October 1918. On 11 November 1918 the armistice ending World War I was concluded but Navy control of the Coast Guard did not end until 28 August 1919 when President Wilson signed an order returning the Coast Guard to Treasury Department control.Kroll, p 130

Return to the Coast Guard
Patrol work in AlaskaUnalga's schedule of summers in Alaska and winter assignments with the Northern Division continued unchanged after the Treasury Department resumed control of the Coast Guard. Duties performed included search and rescue, fisheries patrols, treaty enforcement, delivery of supplies and mail to remote areas, transport of officials and prisoners, medical care, and law enforcement. A portion of each winter in the years 1922 to 1926 was spent on maintenance availabilities and repair work to the cutter. In February 1927, Unalga arrived at Winslow, Washington for a six-week overhaul, leaving 15 April for regular patrol duties in Alaska. On 4 November 1927, she collided with the 15 gross register ton motor vessel Eurus in Dixon Harbor in Southeast Alaska where she had towed Eurus after Eurus′s engine broke down near Cape Spencer, while trying to get a new towline to Eurus after the original towline parted; Eurus sank 20 minutes later, and Unalga rescued her crew of two. On 27 June 1930, Unalga received orders to report to the Coast Guard Depot at Curtis Bay, Maryland for extensive repairs.

DecommissioningUnalga departed Seattle bound for Maryland on 26 July 1930 and arrived at the depot on 5 September. She was placed out of commission on 16 February 1931 and moved to the Philadelphia Navy Yard for repair on 18 February. Repairs at the Navy repair facility were completed and she left Philadelphia for Curtis Bay on 27 June, where additional work was completed. Unalga was again placed in commission 23 April 1932.

Port Everglades and the Navy
On 14 May 1932, Unalga left the Curtis Bay depot bound for her assignment at Port Everglades, Florida, and she arrived on 24 May for patrol duties. On 7 September 1933 she left Port Everglades for Key West, Florida, after being assigned to the Navy Special Service Squadron to be used to patrol the Florida Straits during a series of revolts that eventually put Fulgencio Batista in power in Cuba. The Navy returned her to the Coast Guard on 1 November 1933 after the troubles in Cuba ended, and she returned to patrol work at Port Everglades. She served in the Port Everglades area until 1935 when she was transferred to San Juan, Puerto Rico. During this time Unalga provided rescue service to the stricken Pan American clipper ship, Dominican Clipper, NC15376. As reported in the Boston Globe, Unalga rescued 15 of the 27 passengers when the clipper crashed on landing in San Juan harbor on 3 October 1941. Shortly after she transferred to San Juan, Unalga was the oldest cruising cutter in the Coast Guard inventory.

U.S. Navy and World War IIUnalga served as a patrol cutter for the Coast Guard at San Juan performing law enforcement duties until 1 November 1941 when President Franklin D. Roosevelt transferred by executive order the whole Coast Guard to the control of the Department of the Navy. The Navy assigned her to anti-submarine patrols operating out of San Juan. In September 1943, Unalga was assigned to the Motor Torpedo Boat Squadron Training Center at Melville, Rhode Island where she served as a "target ship" for PT boats and then recovered the test torpedoes. In June 1945, she was relieved of those duties and assigned to the 5th Naval District at Norfolk, Virginia, where she assumed patrol work.

Immigration ship

On 10 October 1945 the U.S. Navy decommissioned Unalga and turned her over to the War Shipping Administration. On 19 July 1946 she was sold and renamed Ulua. She participated in the immigration of Jewish refugees to Palestine. On 24 January 1947 Haganah renamed her Haim Arlosoroff'' after the assassinated leader of the Jewish Agency. The ship  embarked on a voyage that carried 1,378 Jewish refugees in Sweden and Italy bound for Palestine. It was intercepted by the Royal Navy destroyer  and ran aground at Bat Galim, Haifa on 27 February 1947. The crew and passengers, some of whom were injured, were arrested and deported to Cyprus.

Notes

Citations

Bibliography

Further reading
 
 *

External links

1912 ships
Jewish immigrant ships
Ships built in Newport News, Virginia
Ships of the United States Revenue Cutter Service
Ships of the United States Coast Guard
Steamships of the United States